The Buckland Military Training Area (BMTA) is a small arms and manoeuvre range, located  from Hobart, Tasmania. The training area is the largest and most used training area in Tasmania. The range covers 23,428 hectares and has a 400-man camp and Range Complex, which includes a standard grenade range, three sneaker ranges, a snap gallery range, six tactical fire and manoeuvre training areas and a marksmanship training range.

References

Barracks in Australia
Southern Tasmania

Military installations in Tasmania